El Loco is the seventh studio album by the American rock band ZZ Top, released in 1981.

Background
El Loco was produced by Bill Ham and recorded and originally mixed by Terry Manning. The biographer David Blayney explains in his book Sharp Dressed Men that the recording engineer Linden Hudson was involved as a pre-producer on this album. Hudson did not receive credit for engineering the tracks on "Groovy Little Hippie Pad" which were used on the final album mix. In 1987, most of the band's back catalog received a controversial "digitally enhanced" remix treatment for CD release; however, El Loco did not receive this remix treatment and the original mix of the album has been available on CD since 1987.

On June 3, 2013, Gibbons told Joe Bosso of MusicRadar.com that the album was "a really interesting turning point", explaining that the band had "befriended somebody who would become an influential associate, a guy named Linden Hudson. He was a gifted songwriter and had production skills that were leading the pack at times. He brought some elements to the forefront that helped reshape what ZZ Top were doing, starting in the studio and eventually to the live stage. [He] had no fear and was eager to experiment in ways that would frighten most bands. But we followed suit, and the synthesizers started to show up on record. Manufacturers were looking for ways to stimulate sales, and these instruments started appearing on the market. One of our favorite tracks was "Groovy Little Hippie Pad". Right at the very opening, there it is – the heavy sound of a synthesizer. For us, there was no turning back." Gibbons would later cite seeing a Devo soundcheck in Houston as inspiring the synthesizer line on "Groovy Little Hippie Pad." However, Blayney described in his book how Hudson had composed and performed the synthesizer parts at the band's studio in Texas, a tape of which was taken to Memphis to be mixed into the final version of the song, without being credited. The double entendres on "Tube Snake Boogie" and "Pearl Necklace" are barely disguised, while much of the record plays as flat-out goofy party rock.

Track listing

Personnel
Billy Gibbons – guitar, vocals
Dusty Hill – bass, vocals
Frank Beard – drums, percussion
Linden Hudson – synthesizers (uncredited)

Production
Producer – Bill Ham
Engineer – Terry Manning
Pre-production engineer - Linden Hudson
Mastering – Bob Ludwig
Design – Bob Alford
Photography – Bob Alford

Charts

Certifications

References

ZZ Top albums
1981 albums
Albums produced by Bill Ham
Warner Records albums